The Episcopal School of Baton Rouge is a private, college-preparatory, coeducational day school in Baton Rouge, Louisiana. Founded in 1965, it has approximately 900 students residing in East Baton Rouge Parish and surrounding areas, and has a student/teacher ratio of 10:1. The school serves students in grades PreK-3 through 12. Episcopal is located on a  campus located in the eastern section of the city of Baton Rouge.

Episcopal receives no funds from the Episcopal Diocese of Louisiana, solely relying on funds generated from tuition, fees, capital giving, and the Annual Fund, a yearly fundraising program in which all donations made are used for investment in school plans and facilities. The current administrative leadership includes division heads for the Lower School, Middle School, and Upper School.

History
Episcopal School of Baton Rouge was founded in 1964 originally as Episcopal High School with intentions of bringing an Episcopalian college preparatory school to Baton Rouge, Louisiana. Founding members of the school include G. Allen Penniman, Henry Klock, Dick H. Hearin, and A. C. Lewis. Originally on the site of St. James Episcopal Church of Baton Rouge and the old Baton Rouge Junior High School, Episcopal served approximately 300 students in grades 1–8. The first headmaster was Reverend Ralph Webster.

In 1968, students in grades 5-11 moved to the new campus located at 3200 Woodland Ridge Blvd. Students in grades 1-4 remained at the church until the new buildings were completed.  The first senior class of 13 matriculated in 1969.

The school's gymnasium was destroyed in 1971 by a tornado spawned from Hurricane Edith, and much of the rest of the campus was heavily damaged.

Most recently, Episcopal High School allotted space for pre-kindergarteners in 2005.

Athletics
Episcopal High athletics competes in the LHSAA.

Episcopal fields teams in many sports, including softball, soccer, basketball, football, volleyball, baseball, powerlifting, wrestling, swimming, tennis, golf, track and field, and cross-country.

Championships
The boys' cross-country team won 25 state AA titles in a row from 1996 to 2020.

Notable alumni
Katherine Lindley Dodson, Class of 1995, a pediatrician who heroically sacrificed her life to save her employees in a hostage situation on January 26, 2021.

 Todd Graves, Class of 1990, founder of the Louisiana-based fast-food chain Raising Cane's Chicken Fingers.
 Kaylee Hartung, Class of 2003, Reporter for ABC News
 Van Hiles, Class of 1993, is a former NFL defensive back. He played collegiately for the University of Kentucky and in the NFL for the Chicago Bears.
 Meghan O'Leary, Class of 2003, Olympic rower

Jimmy Williams, Class of 1997, NFL cornerback who graduated from Vanderbilt University and played for the Houston Texans, Seattle Seahawks, and San Francisco 49ers.
 Will Wright, Class of 1977, co-founder of the American game development company Maxis and creator of The Sims.

Notable non-graduates

 Reiley McClendon—actor, has appeared on such television shows as Will and Grace and CSI: Crime Scene Investigation.

References

External links
 Episcopal School of Baton Rouge - The school's official website.

Schools in Baton Rouge, Louisiana
Private high schools in Louisiana
Episcopal schools in the United States
Educational institutions established in 1965
Private middle schools in Louisiana
Private elementary schools in Louisiana
1965 establishments in Louisiana